Larry Hochman (born November 21, 1953) is an American orchestrator and composer. He has won four Emmy Awards for his original music on the TV series Wonder Pets! and a Tony Award for his orchestrations for The Book of Mormon.

Early life and training 
He studied music theory and composition at Manhattan School of Music, Eastman School of Music, and Mannes College of Music.

Career 
Hochman's musical One Man Band, for which he wrote the score with Marc Elliot, was produced off-Broadway in 1985, and was later staged at the Coconut Grove Playhouse in Florida. The New York Times reviewer wrote, "The 10 musical numbers, written by Marc Elliot and Larry Hochman, and Mr. Elliot's lyrics for the songs, move the story along and provide some good comic effects...[there are] some old-fashioned songs in the show that you find yourself humming afterward, and a few stay with you a long time."

In 1987, Hochman worked on the short-lived Broadway stage musical Late Nite Comic as orchestrator and musical arranger. Though his arrangements were not recorded on the cast recording in March 1988, they are heard on the 25th Anniversary recording.  Hochman has provided additional orchestrations for the Broadway musicals The Little Mermaid, Prince of Central Park, and The Music Man, among others. He served as orchestrator for Spamalot, which garnered him a Tony Award nomination for Best Orchestrations, as did A Class Act in 2001 and the 2004 revival of Fiddler on the Roof.

Working with Danny Troob, he composed additional music for Disney's Little Mermaid II. Hochman has composed and arranged music for two episodes of Steven Spielberg's Amazing Stories, the TV documentaries Views of a Vanishing Frontier and Yad Vashem, and the films Not for Publication, The Watchman, and Alaska: Spirit of the Wild. He also co-orchestrated (with John DuPrez) the comic oratorio Not the Messiah (He's a Very Naughty Boy) for Eric Idle and John Du Prez.

His musical adaptation of Gaston Leroux's 1910 novel The Phantom of the Opera (not to be confused with Andrew Lloyd Webber's stage version) toured North America in 1990, receiving positive reviews. In 1996, Hochman wrote "A Sondheim Medley", which was later authorized by Mr. Sondheim. Hochman's song, "Rising Like The Sun", was performed at the opening ceremony for America's Millennium in Washington, DC.

He provided orchestrations for the 2004 premiere of Frank Loesser's Señor Discretion Himself at the Arena Stage in Washington, DC. Hochman also orchestrated Marvin Hamlisch's score for the 2009 film The Informant!. Hochman has arranged music for concerts for Paul McCartney, Eric Idle, Mandy Patinkin, Stephen Sondheim, Audra McDonald, Brian Stokes Mitchell, Barry Manilow, Maury Yeston, Marvin Hamlisch, Hugh Jackman, Betty Buckley, Marin Mazzie & Jason Danieley, the Boston Pops Orchestra, the San Francisco Symphony Orchestra and the New York Philharmonic.

In 2010, Hochman provided orchestrations for the musicals The Addams Family and The Scottsboro Boys. Later projects include The Book of Mormon (for which Hochman won Tony and Drama Desk Awards), and Death Takes A Holiday (the 2011 musical by Maury Yeston, Peter Stone and Tom Meehan). In 2014, Hochman orchestrated the Colombian musical Por siempre Navidad by María Isabel Murillo, Misi. It was directed by British choreographer and director Mitch Sebastian and repeated in 2015 due to its enormous success. In 2022, he orchestrated Maury Yeston's December Songs, which was recorded by Victoria Clark.

Personal life
He resides in Fair Lawn, New Jersey, with his wife, Diane, twins Brian and Sarah, and daughter Laurie.

Awards and nominations 
Won
1985 ASCAP Award, Musical Theatre, One Man Band
2008 Emmy Award, Outstanding Achievement in Music, The Wonder Pets
2009 Emmy Award, Outstanding Achievement in Music, The Wonder Pets
2010 Emmy Award, Outstanding Achievement in Music, The Wonder Pets
2010 Emmy Award, Outstanding Original Song for Children's and Animation Program, The Wonder Pets (co-composed with Jerry Bock)
2011 Drama Desk Award, Outstanding Orchestrations, The Book of Mormon
2011 Tony Award, Best Orchestrations, The Book of Mormon
2016 Drama Desk Award, Outstanding Orchestrations, She Loves Me
Nominations
1985 Bistro Award, Composing, One Man Band
2001 Tony Award, Best Orchestrations, A Class Act
2004 Tony Award, Best Orchestrations, Fiddler on the Roof
2005, Drama Desk Award, Outstanding Orchestrations, Spamalot
2005 Tony Award, Best Orchestrations, Spamalot
2010 Drama Desk Award, Outstanding Orchestrations, The Scottsboro Boys
2011 Tony Award, Best Orchestrations, The Scottsboro Boys
2016 Tony Award, Best Orchestrations, She Loves Me
2017 Tony Award, Best Orchestrations, Hello, Dolly!

References

External links 
Official website, "www.larryhochman.net"

Larry Hochman at the Lortel Archives

Larry Hochman as the BroadwayWorld Theatre Database

American male composers
21st-century American composers
Living people
People from Fair Lawn, New Jersey
Musicians from Paterson, New Jersey
Composers for piano
Emmy Award winners
Tony Award winners
1953 births
21st-century American male musicians